The 1990–91 French Rugby Union Championship was 99th edition of France's top division of rugby union.  Bègles-Bordeaux were champions after beating Toulose in the final.

It was the club's second bouclier de Brennus after their first win in 1969.

Formula 
 The tournament was played by 80 clubs divided in 20 pools of four.
 The two best from each pool (a total of 40 clubs) were admitted to group A to play for the title.
 In the second round the 40 clubs of group A were divided in five pools of eight.
 The first three of each pool and the best fourth place team advanced to the knockout stage.

Group A qualification round to knockout stage 
The teams are listed as the ranking, in bold the teams admitted to "last 16" round.

"Last 16" phase 
In bold are the clubs qualified for the quarter finals.

Quarter of finals 
In bold the clubs qualified for the next round

Semifinals

Final

References

External links 
 Compte rendu finale 1991 lnr.fr
 finale 1991 finalesrugby.com

1991
France
Championship